Teresa de Rogatis (15 October 1893 – 8 January 1979) was an Italian composer, guitarist, pianist and music teacher.

Biography

Teresa de Rogatis was born in Naples on 15 October 1893. She was seen as a child prodigy giving her first recital when she was just seven. She studied in the Conservatorio San Pietro at Majella and gave concert tours. It was on one such tour in Egypt that de Rogatis met her husband the Swiss man Paolo Feninger. She settled in Cairo and helped found the National Conservatory of Egypt. She continued to teach and compose in Cairo until her husband died. In 1963 de Rogatis returned to live in Naples. Again she set herself to teaching and composing. Her son Mario Feninger, is a concert pianist. He created the Teresa de Rogatis Foundation in Los Angeles. de Rogatis died in January 1979.

Sources

1893 births
1979 deaths
Italian classical composers
People from Naples